, or Ozu Island, is an inhabited island in the Inland Sea, Japan. Administratively, it forms part of the city of Shūnan, Yamaguchi Prefecture. Ōzushima is also known as "Kaiten Island".

Geography
Parks on the island include Ōzushima Park and Mashima Park, while part of the island and its surrounding waters is protected within Setonaikai National Park. The southern coastline is suffering from severe coastal erosion.

Flora

History
The name of the recently formed city of Shūnan, in which Ōzushima is located, is a portmanteau of two characters (周南) that denote its situation in the south of old Suō Province.

During the Great Pacific War, the island served as a testing and training base for the Imperial Japanese Navy's Special Attack submarine force, the Kaiten (manned torpedoes). With its origins as a testing range from 1938 for the Type 93 "oxygen torpedo", for construction of the Kaiten base, eight large caissons were towed over from Ōita Prefecture, the first in October 1943, the last in October 1944, with five further small caissons produced on Ōzushima. Opening in September 1944, this base was the first of what would be four such facilities (the others following in nearby Hikari, in November, and Hirao, in March,  opening in what is now Hiji, Ōita Prefecture, in May 1945). Also on the island, and surviving in part, developed between November 1941 and May 1943 to protect Tokuyama Port and other nearby military facilities, on the summit of Mount Ōzu, the island's highest point, was an anti-aircraft battery, which in 1943 had five guns and a detail of fifty-four men.

Also, it is due to this element of Ōzushima's past, commemorated at the Kaiten Memorial Museum, surrounded by cherries that flower and fall in the spring, that the island is sometimes referred to as "Kaiten Island".

Post-war and in recent decades, the demographic changes affecting the country have seen Ōzushima's population decline from a few thousand to a couple of hundred (269 in 2009, 227 in 2020), with many of those remaining of retirement age.

Intangible Heritage

 Heike Odori dances, performed for the souls of the vanquished Taira (Heike) clan, some of the survivors having settled on Ōzushima
  song: documentation and performance activities are being carried out by a preservation society
 , the master mason, who, when the locals were at a quandary as to how best to go about transporting the stones for Ōsaka Castle, fanned them with his fan, at which point, as if rising up and floating, they spontaneously betook themselves to and piled themselves upon rafts along the shore (a small hokora shrine dedicated to Santarō remains to this day at Setohama)

Economy
Cultivation of tobacco and mikan was once widespread. Output now includes marine products, such as hijiki and wakame seaweed, sweet potatoes, and sake (marketed under the label ).

Meibutsu

Transportation
As of May 2020, there were two vessels and seven crossings a day.

Related maps and images

See also

 Setonaikai National Park
 Etajima, Ōkunoshima, Hashima
 Yasukuni Jinja Yūshūkan
 Chiran Peace Museum for Kamikaze Pilots
 Noshima

References

External links
  Japan's outlying islands (MLIT)
  Basic map of Ōzushima's sites (Shūnan City)
  Map and images of the island's Kaiten-related facilities (Shūnan City)
  Detailed maps of Setonaikai National Park (Ministry of the Environment; Ōzushima to the top left of 山口県･福岡県地域（西部）)

Shūnan, Yamaguchi
Islands of the Seto Inland Sea
Islands of Yamaguchi Prefecture